The sovereign prince is the monarch and head of state of the Principality of Monaco. All reigning princes have taken the name of the House of Grimaldi, although some have belonged to other families (Goyon de Matignon or Polignac) in the male line. When Prince Rainier III died in 2005, he was Europe's longest reigning monarch. The Grimaldi family, which has ruled Monaco for eight centuries, is Europe's longest-ruling royal family.

The presently reigning prince is Albert II, who ascended in April 2005.

Powers of the prince
Monaco, along with Liechtenstein and Vatican City, is one of only three states in Western Europe where the monarch still plays an active role in day-to-day politics.  

The Prince of Monaco exercises their authority in accordance with the Constitution and laws. They represent the principality in foreign relations and any revision, either total or partial, of the Constitution must be jointly agreed to by the monarch and the National Council.

Legislative power is divided between the Prince who initiates the laws, and the National Council which votes on them. Executive power is retained by the monarch, who has veto power over all legislation proposed by the National Council.

The minister of state and the Government Council are directly responsible to the Prince for the administration of the principality. 

Judiciary powers also belong to the monarch. The present Constitution states that the prince has full authority in the courts and tribunals which render justice in his or her name. 

Pursuant to Article 16 of the 1962 Constitution, the Prince confers orders, titles and other distinctions (see Awards and decorations of Monaco) as the fons honorum of the Principality of Monaco.

In 2005, The New York Times reported that loyalty to the princely family is fierce; few residents of Monaco want to be quoted saying anything negative about the monarchy.

Compensation
The princely family receives annual allocation from the budget of Monaco, €43.5 million in 2015.

Titles and styles
The Prince is styled His Serene Highness. Although used only formally, the Prince also bears several other hereditary titles, some of which are occasionally bestowed on his relatives or their spouses. Most were granted or recognised by the Kingdom of France or the Papal States and could only pass through the male line; they therefore became extinct as French dignities on the death of Albert's great-grandfather Prince Louis II in 1949. Thereafter, some of these titles were implicitly re-created as distinctly Monegasque titles.

The current prince's complete titles and styles are, in precedent order of rank:

 Sovereign Prince of Monaco
 Duke of Valentinois
 Duke of Estouteville
 Duke of Mazarin
 Duke of Mayenne
 Prince of Château-Porcien
 Marquis of Baux (Title now used by Hereditary Prince Jacques)
 Marquis of Chilly-Mazarin
 Marquis of Guiscard
 Marquis of Bailli
 Count of Polignac (French title)
 Count of Carladès
 Count of Ferrette, Belfort, Thann and 
 Count of Torigni 
 Count of Longjumeau
 Count of Clèdes
 Baron of Calvinet
 Baron of Buis
 Baron of La Luthumière
 Baron of Hambye
 Baron of Altkirch
 Baron of Saint-Lô
 Baron of Massy
  (Lord) of Issenheim
 Seigneur of Saint-Rémy
 Sire of Matignon
All palace correspondence features capitalized pronouns when referring to the prince.

The tradition of the monarchy of Monaco was that the flag flying from the staff on the tower above his office be hoisted when the prince was present in Monaco. The current prince flies the flag whether he is present or not, preferring to keep his location private.

Monaco is officially protected by France, according to terms set forth in the Treaty of Versailles in 1918.

See also
 List of Monégasque consorts
 List of rulers of Monaco
 Succession to the Monegasque throne

References

 
Monegasque titles
Politics of Monaco
Political organisations based in Monaco